Frank Smith (5 March 1905 – 7 December 1968) was a former Australian rules footballer who played with Melbourne in the Victorian Football League (VFL).

In 2003 he was selected in Prahran's Team of the Century.

Notes

External links 

1905 births
Australian rules footballers from Victoria (Australia)
Melbourne Football Club players
Prahran Football Club players
1968 deaths